Taiwanese Hakka is a language group consisting of Hakka dialects spoken in Taiwan, and mainly used by people of Hakka ancestry. Taiwanese Hakka is divided into five main dialects: Sixian, Hailu, Dabu, Raoping, and Zhao'an. The most widely spoken of the five Hakka dialects in Taiwan are Sixian and Hailu. The former, possessing 6 tones, originates from Meizhou, Guangdong, and is mainly spoken in Miaoli, Pingtung and Kaohsiung, while the latter, possessing 7 tones, originates from Haifeng and Lufeng, Guangdong, and is concentrated around Hsinchu. Taiwanese Hakka is also officially listed as one of the national languages of Taiwan. In addition to the five main dialects, there are the northern Xihai dialect and the patchily-distributed Yongding, Fengshun, Wuping, Wuhua, and Jiexi dialects.

See also
Taiwanese Hakka Romanization System
Languages of Taiwan

Notes

References

External links
 

Hakka Chinese
Languages of Taiwan